Never Say Never Again is a 1983 spy film directed by Irvin Kershner. The film is based on the 1961 James Bond novel Thunderball by Ian Fleming, which in turn was based on an original story by Kevin McClory, Jack Whittingham, and Fleming. The novel had been previously adapted as the 1965 film of the same name. Never Say Never Again is the second and most recent James Bond film not to be produced by Eon Productions, the usual producer of the Bond series, but by Jack Schwartzman's Taliafilm, and was distributed by Warner Bros. instead of United Artists. The film was executive produced by Kevin McClory, one of the original writers of the Thunderball storyline. McClory had retained the filming rights of the novel following a long legal battle dating from the 1960s.

Sean Connery played the role of Bond for the seventh and final time, marking his return to the character 12 years after Diamonds Are Forever. The film's title is a reference to Connery's reported declaration in 1971 that he would "never" play that role again. As Connery was 52 at the time of filming, the script makes frequent reference to Bond as aging and past his prime; though ironically Connery was three years younger than incumbent Bond Roger Moore. The storyline features Bond being brought back into action to investigate the theft of two nuclear weapons by SPECTRE. Filming locations included France, Spain, the Bahamas and Elstree Studios in the United Kingdom.

Never Say Never Again was released by Warner Bros. on 7 October 1983, and opened to positive reviews, with the acting of Connery and Klaus Maria Brandauer singled out for praise as more emotionally resonant than the typical Bond films of the day. The film grossed $160 million at the box office, making it a commercial success, though it earned less overall than the Eon-produced Octopussy,  released earlier the same year.

Plot
After MI6 agent James Bond fails a routine training exercise, his superior M orders Bond to a health clinic outside London to get back into shape. While there, Bond witnesses a mysterious nurse named Fatima Blush giving a sadomasochistic beating to a patient in a nearby room. The man's face is bandaged and after Blush finishes her beating, Bond sees the patient using a machine which scans his eye. Bond is seen by Blush, who sends an assassin named Lippe, to kill him in the clinic gym. Though Bond manages to fight back and kill Lippe, the incident drove an angry M to suspend Bond from active duty as he was forced to pay for the damages in the clinic caused by the fight between Bond and Lippe.

Blush is an operative of SPECTRE, a criminal organisation run by Ernst Stavro Blofeld; her charge is a heroin-addicted United States Air Force pilot named Jack Petachi. Petachi has undergone an operation on his right eye to make it match the retinal pattern of the US President, which he uses to circumvent iris recognition security at RAF Station Swadley, an American military base in England.  While doing so, he replaces the dummy warheads of two AGM-86B cruise missiles with live nuclear warheads; SPECTRE then steals the warheads, intending to extort billions of dollars from NATO governments. Blush murders Petachi by causing his car to crash and explode, covering SPECTRE's tracks.

Foreign Secretary Lord Ambrose orders a reluctant M to reactivate the double-0 section, and Bond is tasked with tracking down the missing weapons. Bond follows a lead to the Bahamas where he finds Domino Petachi, the pilot's sister, and her wealthy lover Maximillian Largo, who is SPECTRE's top agent.

Bond is informed by Nigel Small-Fawcett of the British High Commission that Largo's yacht is now heading for Nice, France. There, Bond joins forces with his French contact Nicole, and his CIA counterpart and friend, Felix Leiter. Bond goes to a health and beauty centre where he poses as an employee and, while giving Domino a massage, is informed by her that Largo is hosting an event at a casino that evening. At the charity event, Largo and Bond play a 3-D video game called Domination; the losing player of each turn receives a series of electric shocks of increasing intensity in proportion to the amount wagered. After losing a few games, Bond ultimately wins, and while dancing with Domino, he informs her that her brother had been killed on Largo's orders. Bond returns to his villa to find Nicole killed by Blush. After a vehicle chase on his Q-branch motorbike, Bond finds himself in an ambush and is eventually captured by Blush. She admits that she is impressed with him, and forces Bond to declare in writing that she is his "Number One" sexual partner. Bond distracts her with promises, then uses his Q-branch-issue fountain pen gun to kill Blush with an explosive dart.

Bond and Leiter attempt to board Largo's motor yacht, the Flying Saucer, in search of the missing nuclear warheads. Bond finds Domino. He attempts to make Largo jealous by kissing Domino in front of a one-way mirror. Largo becomes enraged, traps Bond and takes him and Domino to Palmyra, Largo's base of operations in North Africa. Largo coldly punishes Domino for her betrayal by selling her to some passing Arabs. Bond subsequently escapes from his prison and rescues her.

Domino and Bond reunite with Leiter on a U.S. Navy submarine. After the first warhead is found and defused in Washington, D.C., they track Largo to a location known as the Tears of Allah, below a desert oasis on the Ethiopian coast. Bond and Leiter infiltrate the underground facility and a gun battle erupts between Leiter's team and Largo's men in the temple. In the confusion, Largo makes a getaway with the second warhead. Bond catches and fights Largo underwater. Just as Largo tries to use a spear gun to shoot Bond, he is shot with a spear gun by Domino, taking revenge for her brother's death. Bond then defuses the nuclear bomb underwater, saving the world. Bond retires from duty and returns to the Bahamas with Domino, vowing never again to be a secret agent.

Cast

 Sean Connery as James Bond, MI6 agent 007.
 Klaus Maria Brandauer as Maximillian Largo, a billionaire businessman and SPECTRE Number 1, SPECTRE's senior-most agent. He is based on the character Emilio Largo in Thunderball
 Max von Sydow as Ernst Stavro Blofeld, the head of SPECTRE.
 Barbara Carrera as Fatima Blush; SPECTRE Number 12, assigned to hunt down and kill Bond. She is based on Fiona Volpe in Thunderball.
 Kim Basinger as Domino Petachi, sister of Jack Petachi and girlfriend/mistress of Maximillian Largo. The surname was changed to Petrescu for the Italian release of the film.
 Bernie Casey as Felix Leiter, Bond's CIA contact and friend.
 Alec McCowen as "Q" Algy (Algernon), Double-0 section Quartermaster who issues specialised equipment to Bond.
 Edward Fox as "M", Bond's superior at MI6.

 Pamela Salem as Miss Moneypenny, M's secretary.
 Rowan Atkinson as Nigel Small-Fawcett, Foreign Office representative in the Bahamas.
 Valerie Leon as Lady in Bahamas, whom Bond seduces.
 Milow Kirek as Dr. Kovacs, a nuclear physicist working for SPECTRE.
 Pat Roach as Lippe, a SPECTRE assassin who tries to kill Bond at the clinic.
 Anthony Sharp as Lord Ambrose, Foreign Secretary who orders M to reactivate the Double-0 section.
 Prunella Gee as Nurse Patricia Fearing, a physiotherapist at the clinic.
 Gavan O'Herlihy as Captain Jack Petachi, a USAF pilot used by SPECTRE to steal the nuclear missiles, and Domino Petachi's brother.

Production
Never Say Never Again had its origins in the early 1960s, following the controversy over the 1961 Thunderball novel. Fleming had worked with independent producer Kevin McClory and scriptwriter Jack Whittingham on a script for a potential Bond film, to be called Longitude 78 West, which was subsequently abandoned because of the costs involved. Fleming, "always reluctant to let a good idea lie idle", turned this into the novel Thunderball, for which he did not credit either McClory or Whittingham; McClory then took Fleming to the High Court in London for breach of copyright and the matter was settled in 1963. After Eon Productions started producing the Bond films, it subsequently made a deal with McClory, who would produce Thunderball, and then not make any further version of the novel for a period of ten years following the release of the Eon-produced version in 1965.

In the mid-1970s McClory again started working on a project to bring a Thunderball adaptation to production and, with the working title Warhead, he brought writer Len Deighton together with Sean Connery to work on a script. A lawsuit with Eon Productions ended in a ruling that McClory owned the sole rights to SPECTRE and Blofeld, forcing Eon to remove them from The Spy Who Loved Me (1977). The script initially focused on SPECTRE shooting down aircraft over the Bermuda Triangle before taking over Liberty Island and Ellis Island as staging areas for an invasion of New York City through the sewers under Wall Street. The script was purchased by Paramount Pictures in 1978. The script ran into difficulties after accusations from Danjaq and United Artists that the project had gone beyond copyright restrictions, which confined McClory to a film based only on the novel Thunderball, and once again the project was deferred.

Towards the end of the 1970s developments were reported on the project under the name James Bond of the Secret Service, but when producer Jack Schwartzman became involved in 1980 and cleared a number of the legal issues that still surrounded the project he decided against using Deighton's script. The project returned to the original nuclear terrorism plot of the original Thunderball in order to avoid another lawsuit from Danjaq and after McClory saw Jimmy Carter mention the issue in a 1980 presidential debate with Ronald Reagan. Schwartzman brought on board scriptwriter Lorenzo Semple, Jr. to work on the screenplay, who Schwartzman wanted to make the screenplay "somewhere in the middle" between his campier projects such as Batman and his more serious projects such as Three Days of the Condor. Connery was unhappy with some aspects of the work and asked Tom Mankiewicz, who had rewritten Diamonds Are Forever, to work on the script; however, Mankiewicz declined as he felt he was under a moral obligation to Eon's Albert R. Broccoli. Semple Jr. ultimately left the project after Irvin Kershner was hired as director and Schwartzman began cutting out the "big numbers" from his script to save on the budget. Connery then hired British television writers Dick Clement and Ian La Frenais to undertake re-writes, although they went uncredited for their efforts despite much of the final shooting script being theirs. This was because of a restriction by the Writers Guild of America. Clement and La Frenais continued rewriting during the production, often altering it from day to day.

The film underwent one final change in title: after Connery had finished filming Diamonds Are Forever he had pledged that he would "never" play Bond again. Connery's wife, Micheline, suggested the title Never Say Never Again, referring to her husband's vow and the producers acknowledged her contribution by listing on the end credits "Title Never Say Never Again by Micheline Connery". A final attempt by Fleming's trustees to block the film was made in the High Court in London in the spring of 1983, but this was thrown out by the court and Never Say Never Again was permitted to proceed.

Cast and crew
When producer Kevin McClory had first planned the film in 1964, he held initial talks with Richard Burton for the part of Bond, although the project came to nothing because of the legal issues involved. When the Warhead project was launched in the late 1970s, a number of actors were mentioned in the trade press, including Orson Welles for the part of Blofeld, Trevor Howard to play M and Richard Attenborough as director.

In 1978, the working title James Bond of the Secret Service was being used and Connery was in the frame once again, potentially going head-to-head with the next Eon Bond film, Moonraker. By 1980, with legal issues again causing the project to founder, Connery thought himself unlikely to play the role, as he stated in an interview in the Sunday Express: "When I first worked on the script with Len I had no thought of actually being in the film." When producer Jack Schwartzman became involved, he asked Connery to play Bond; Connery agreed, negotiating a fee of $3 million ($ million in  dollars), casting and script approval, and a percentage of the profits. Subsequent to Connery reprising the role, Semple altered the script to include several references to Bond's advancing years – playing on Connery being 52 at the time of filming – and academic Jeremy Black has pointed out that there are other aspects of age and disillusionment in the film, such as the Shrubland's porter referring to Bond's car ("They don't make them like that anymore"), the new M having no use for the 00 section and Q with his reduced budgets.  Originally Semple wanted to emphasize Bond's age even further, writing the script to include him in semi-retirement working aboard a Scottish fishing trawler hunting Soviet Navy submarines in the North Sea. Connery's casting was formally announced in March 1983. He trained with Steven Seagal to help get in shape for the production.

For the main villain in the film, Maximillian Largo, Connery suggested Klaus Maria Brandauer, the lead of the 1981 Academy Award-winning Hungarian film Mephisto. Through the same route came Max von Sydow as Ernst Stavro Blofeld, although he still retained his Eon-originated white cat in the film. For the femme fatale, director Irvin Kershner selected former model and Playboy cover girl Barbara Carrera to play Fatima Blush – the name coming from one of the early scripts of Thunderball. Carrera said she modeled her performance on the Hindu goddess Kali, and to "mix that in with a little bit of black widow and a little bit of praying mantis." Carrera's performance as Fatima Blush earned her a Golden Globe Award nomination for Best Supporting Actress, which she lost to Cher for her role in Silkwood.
Micheline Connery, Sean's wife, had met up-and-coming actress Kim Basinger at the Grosvenor House Hotel in London and suggested her to Connery, and he agreed after Dalila Di Lazzaro refused the Domino role. For the role of Felix Leiter, Connery spoke with Bernie Casey, saying that as the Leiter role was never remembered by audiences, using a black Leiter might make him more memorable. Others cast included comedian Rowan Atkinson, who would later parody Bond in his role of Johnny English in 2003. Atkinson's character was added by Clement and La Frenais after the production had already started in order to provide the film with a comic relief. Edward Fox was cast as M in order to portray the character as a young technocrat in contrast to the older portrayal by Bernard Lee, and to parody the Thatcher ministry's budget cuts to government services.

Connery wanted to persuade Richard Donner to direct the film, but after their meeting Donner decided he disliked the script. Former Eon Productions' editor and director of On Her Majesty's Secret Service, Peter R. Hunt, was approached to direct the film but declined due to his previous work with Eon. Irvin Kershner, who had previously worked with Connery on A Fine Madness (1966), and had achieved success in 1980 with The Empire Strikes Back was then hired. A number of the crew from the 1981 film Raiders of the Lost Ark were also appointed, including first assistant director David Tomblin, director of photography Douglas Slocombe, second unit director Mickey Moore and production designers Philip Harrison and Stephen Grimes.

Filming

Filming for Never Say Never Again began on 27 September 1982 on the French Riviera for two months before moving to Nassau, the Bahamas in mid-November where filming took place at Clifton Pier, which was also one of the locations used in Thunderball. Largo's Palmyran fortress was actually historic Fort Carré in Antibes. Largo's ship, the Flying Saucer, was portrayed by the yacht Kingdom 5KR, then owned by Saudi billionaire Adnan Khashoggi and called the Nabila. The underwater scenes were filmed by Ricou Browning, who had coordinated the underwater scenes in the original Thunderball. Principal photography finished at Elstree Studios where interior shots were filmed. Elstree also housed the Tears of Allah underwater cavern, which took three months to construct, while the Shrublands health spa was filmed at Luton Hoo. Most of the filming was completed in the spring of 1983, although there was some additional shooting during the summer of 1983.

Production on the film was troubled, with Connery taking on many of the production duties with assistant director David Tomblin. Director Irvin Kershner was critical of producer Jack Schwartzman, saying that, while he was a good businessman, "he didn't have the experience of a film producer". After the production ran out of money, Schwartzman had to fund further production out of his own pocket and later admitted he had underestimated the amount the film would cost to make. There was tension on set between Schwartzman and Connery, who at times barely spoke to each other. Connery was unimpressed with the perceived lack of professionalism behind the scenes and was on record as saying that the whole production was a "bloody Mickey Mouse operation!"

Steven Seagal, who was a martial arts instructor for this film, broke Connery's wrist while training. On an episode of The Tonight Show with Jay Leno, Connery revealed he did not know his wrist was broken until over a decade later.

Music
James Horner was both Kershner's and Schwartzman's first choice to compose the score after being impressed with his work on Star Trek II: The Wrath of Khan. Horner, who worked in London for most of the time, wound up unavailable according to Kershner, though Schwartzman later claimed Sean Connery vetoed the American. Frequent Bond composer John Barry was invited, but declined out of loyalty to Eon. The music for Never Say Never Again was written by Michel Legrand, who composed a score similar to his work as a jazz pianist. The score has been criticised as "anachronistic and misjudged", "bizarrely intermittent" and "the most disappointing feature of the film". Legrand also wrote the main theme "Never Say Never Again", which featured lyrics by Alan and Marilyn Bergman — who had also worked with Legrand on the Academy Award-winning song "The Windmills of Your Mind" — and was performed by Lani Hall after Bonnie Tyler, who disliked the song, had reluctantly declined.

Phyllis Hyman also recorded a potential theme song, written by Stephen Forsyth and Jim Ryan, but the song — an unsolicited submission — was passed over, given Legrand's contractual obligations with the music.

Legal substitutions

Many of the elements of the Eon-produced Bond films were not present in Never Say Never Again for legal reasons. These included the gun barrel sequence, where a screen full of 007 symbols appeared instead, and similarly there was no "James Bond Theme" to use, although no effort was made to supply another tune. A pre-credits sequence was filmed but not used; instead the film opens with the credits run over the top of the opening sequence of Bond on a training mission.

Release and reception
Never Say Never Again opened on 7 October 1983 in 1,550 theatres grossing an October record $10,958,157 over the four-day Columbus Day weekend which was reported to be "the best opening record of any James Bond film" up to that point surpassing Octopussys $8.9 million from June that year. The film had its UK premiere at the Warner West End cinema in Leicester Square on 14 December 1983. Worldwide, Never Say Never Again grossed $160 million, which was a solid return on the budget of $36 million. The film ultimately earned less than Octopussy which grossed $187.5 million. It was the first James Bond film to be officially released in the Soviet Union, premiering in the summer of 1990 with a gala in Moscow.

Warner Bros. released Never Say Never Again on VHS and Betamax in 1984, and on laserdisc in 1995. After Metro-Goldwyn-Mayer purchased the distribution rights in 1997 (see Legacy, below), the company has released the film on both VHS and DVD in 2001, and on Blu-ray in 2009.

Contemporary reviews
Never Say Never Again was broadly welcomed and praised by the critics: Ian Christie, writing in the Daily Express, said that Never Say Never Again was "one of the better Bonds", finding the film "superbly witty and entertaining, ... the dialogue is crisp and the fight scenes imaginative". Christie also thought that "Connery has lost none of his charm and, if anything, is more appealing than ever as the stylish resolute hero". David Robinson, writing in The Times also concentrated on Connery, saying that: "Connery ... is back, looking hardly a day older or thicker, and still outclassing every other exponent of the role, in the goodnatured throwaway with which he parries all the sex and violence on the way". For Robinson, the presence of Connery and Klaus Maria Brandauer as Maximillian Largo "very nearly make it all worthwhile." The reviewer for Time Out summed up Never Say Never Again saying "The action's good, the photography excellent, the sets decent; but the real clincher is the fact that Bond is once more played by a man with the right stuff."

Derek Malcolm in The Guardian showed himself to be a fan of Connery's Bond, saying the film contains "the best Bond in the business", but nevertheless did not find Never Say Never Again any more enjoyable than the recently released Octopussy (starring Roger Moore), or "that either of them came very near to matching Dr. No or From Russia with Love". Malcolm's main issue with the film was that he had a "feeling that a constant struggle was going on between a desire to make a huge box-office success and the effort to make character as important as stunts". Malcolm summed up that "the mix remains obstinately the same – up to scratch but not surpassing it". Writing in  The Observer, Philip French noted that "this curiously muted film ends up making no contribution of its own and inviting damaging comparisons with the original, hyper-confident Thunderball". French concluded that "like an hour-glass full of damp sand, the picture moves with increasing slowness as it approaches a confused climax in the Persian Gulf".

Writing for Newsweek, critic Jack Kroll thought the early part of the film was handled "with wit and style", although he went on to say that the director was "hamstrung by Lorenzo Semple's script". Richard Schickel, writing in Time magazine praised the film and its cast. He wrote that Klaus Maria Brandauer's character was "played with silky, neurotic charm", while Barbara Carrera, playing Fatima Blush, "deftly parodies all the fatal femmes who have slithered through Bond's career". Schickel's highest praise was saved for the return of Connery, observing "it is good to see Connery's grave stylishness in this role again. It makes Bond's cynicism and opportunism seem the product of genuine worldliness (and world weariness) as opposed to Roger Moore's mere twirpishness."

Janet Maslin, writing in The New York Times, was broadly praising of the film, saying she thought that Never Say Never Again "has noticeably more humor and character than the Bond films usually provide. It has a marvelous villain in Largo." Maslin also thought highly of Connery in the role, observing that "in Never Say Never Again, the formula is broadened to accommodate an older, seasoned man of much greater stature, and Mr. Connery expertly fills the bill." Writing in The Washington Post, Gary Arnold was fulsome in his praise, saying that Never Say Never Again is "one of the best James Bond adventure thrillers ever made", going on to say that "this picture is likely to remain a cherished, savory example of commercial filmmaking at its most astute and accomplished." Arnold went further, saying that "Never Say Never Again is the best acted Bond picture ever made, because it clearly surpasses any predecessors in the area of inventive and clever character delineation".

The critic for The Globe and Mail, Jay Scott, also praised the film, saying that Never Say Never Again "may be the only instalment of the long-running series that has been helmed by a first-rate director." According to Scott, the director, with high-quality support cast, resulted in the "classiest of all the Bonds". Roger Ebert gave the film 3½ out of 4 stars, and wrote that Never Say Never Again, while consisting of a basic "Bond plot", was different from other Bond films: "For one thing, there's more of a human element in the movie, and it comes from Klaus Maria Brandauer, as Largo." Ebert went on to add, "there was never a Beatles reunion ... but here, by God, is Sean Connery as Sir James Bond. Good work, 007." Gene Siskel of The Chicago Tribune also gave the film 3½ out of 4 stars, writing that the film was "one of the best 007 adventures ever made".

Colin Greenland reviewed Never Say Never Again for Imagine magazine, and stated that "Never Say Never Again is a complacent male sexist fantasy, where women can be only femmes fatales or passive victims."

Retrospective reviews
Because Never Say Never Again is not an Eon-produced film, it has not been included in a number of subsequent reviews. Norman Wilner of MSN said that 1967's Casino Royale and Never Say Never Again "exist outside the 'official' continuity, [and] are excluded from this list, just as they're absent from MGM's megabox. But take my word for it; they're both pretty awful". Retrospective reviews of the film remain positive. Rotten Tomatoes sampled 55 critics and judged 71% of the reviews as positive, with a top critics' rating of 70%. The site's critical consensus reads: "While the rehashed story feels rather uninspired and unnecessary, the return of both Sean Connery and a more understated Bond make Never Say Never Again a watchable retread." The score is still more positive than some of the Eon films, with Rotten Tomatoes ranking Never Say Never Again 16th among all Bond films in 2008. On Metacritic, the film has a weighted average score of 68 out of 100 based on 15 critics, indicating generally favourable reviews. Empire gives the film three of a possible five stars, observing that "Connery was perhaps wise to call it quits the first time round". IGN gave Never Say Never Again a score of 5 out of 10, claiming that the film "is more miss than hit". The review also thought that the film was "marred with too many clunky exposition scenes and not enough moments of Bond being Bond".

In 1995 Michael Sauter of Entertainment Weekly rated Never Say Never Again as the ninth best Bond film to that point, after 17 films had been released. Sauter thought the film "is successful only as a portrait of an over-the-hill superhero." He admitted that "even past his prime, Connery proves that nobody does it better". James Berardinelli, in his review of  Never Say Never Again, thinks the re-writing of the Thunderball story has led to a film which has "a hokey, jokey feel, [it] is possibly the worst-written Bond script of all". Berardinelli concludes that "it's a major disappointment that, having lured back the original 007, the film makers couldn't offer him something better than this drawn-out, hackneyed story." Critic Danny Peary wrote that "it was great to see Sean Connery return as James Bond after a dozen years". He also thought the supporting cast was good, saying that Klaus Maria Brandauer's Largo was "neurotic, vulnerable ... one of the most complex of Bond's foes" and that Barbara Carrera and Kim Basinger "make lasting impressions." Peary also wrote that the "film is exotic, well acted, and stylishly directed ... It would be one of the best Bond films if the finale weren't disappointing. When will filmmakers realize that underwater fight scenes don't work because viewers usually can't tell the hero and villain apart and they know doubles are being used?"

Legacy
Originally Never Say Never Again was intended to start a series of Bond films produced by  Schwartzman and starring Connery as James Bond, with McClory announcing the next planned film S.P.E.C.T.R.E in a February 1984 issue of Screen International. When Connery announced that he would not reprise his role as Bond in another film produced by Schwartzman three weeks before the deadline to purchase the rights to another film for $5 million, Schwartzman said that he was unlikely to make another film without a deal from MGM/UA and Danjaq.

In the 1990s, McClory announced plans to make another adaptation of the Thunderball story starring Timothy Dalton entitled Warhead 2000 AD, but the film was eventually scrapped. In 1997 Sony Pictures acquired McClory's rights for an undisclosed amount, and subsequently announced that it intended to make a series of Bond films, as the company also held the rights to Casino Royale. This move prompted a round of litigation from MGM, which was settled out-of-court, forcing Sony to give up all claims on Bond; McClory still claimed he would proceed with another Bond film, and continued his case against MGM and Danjaq; On 27 August 2001 the court rejected McClory's suit. McClory died in 2006;  MGM's acquisition of the rights to Casino Royale finally allowed Eon Productions to make a serious, non-satirical film adaptation of that novel the same year with Daniel Craig as James Bond. Ultimately, in 2013, McClory's heirs sold the Thunderball rights to Eon, allowing the company to reintroduce Blofeld to the Eon series in the film Spectre.

On 4 December 1997, MGM announced that the company had purchased the rights to Never Say Never Again from Schwartzman's company Taliafilm. The company has since handled the release of both the DVD and Blu-ray editions of the film.

See also

 Outline of James Bond

References

Bibliography

External links

 
 
 
 
 Never Say Never Again at Metro-Goldwyn-Mayer

1983 films
1983 action films
1980s spy films
Films shot at EMI-Elstree Studios
Films scored by Michel Legrand
Films about nuclear war and weapons
Films directed by Irvin Kershner
Cold War spy films
Films set in Africa
Films set in the Bahamas
Films set in England
Films set in France
Films set in Monaco
Films shot in the Bahamas
Films shot in England
Films shot in Florida
Films shot in France
Films shot in Malta
Films shot in Monaco
James Bond films
Underwater action films
Films with screenplays by Lorenzo Semple Jr.
Films shot in Almería
Films with screenplays by Jack Whittingham
Films with screenplays by Kevin McClory
Films with screenplays by Ian Fleming
Films with screenplays by Dick Clement
Films with screenplays by Ian La Frenais
Warner Bros. films
Films set in Eritrea
Films about heroin addiction
Films shot in Hertfordshire
1980s English-language films
American spy action films
1980s American films
1980s British films